Saul Williams is the second solo studio album by Saul Williams. It was released by Fader Label in 2004. It features contributions from Serj Tankian, Zack de la Rocha, and Isaiah "Ikey" Owens.

Critical reception

Adam Greenberg of AllMusic gave the album 4 stars out of 5, saying: "On his self-titled album, Williams moves toward a slightly more accessible format (compared to his previous, more poetry driven work) with twisted guitar lines, heavy bass thumps, and a closer stab at singing from time to time." Robert Gabriel of The Austin Chronicle gave the album 3.5 stars out of 5, saying: "Social, psychological, and cultural mores are run through a ringer of rap transformed as punk, metal, and jungle with Williams self-producing much of his own inflammatory cache." Mike Diver of Drowned in Sound gave the album a 10 out of 10, saying: "Its importance is absolute." Ari Levenfeld of PopMatters said, "Saul Williams' attempt to save hip hop is admirable, if not entirely successful."

Track listing

Personnel
Credits adapted from liner notes.

Musicians
 Saul Williams – vocals, programming, production (3, 5, 6, 7, 8, 9, 10, 11, 12)
 Mickey P – co-production (3, 5, 6, 7, 8, 9, 10, 11, 12), programming (8), additional programming (2, 3, 5, 7), engineering, mixing
 Serj Tankian – production (1), piano (1), background vocals (1)
 Ani Maljian – background vocals (1)
 Musa Bailey – production (2), programming (2)
 Thavius Beck – production (4)
 Zack de la Rocha – additional vocals (4)
 Saturn – background vocals (5)
 Isaiah "Ikey" Owens – piano (7), organ (7)
 Mia Doi Todd – additional vocals (11)
 Carmen – background vocals (11)

Technical personnel
 Brandy Flower – design, photography
 Keba Konte – photography
 Katina Parker – photography
 Varshini Soobiah – photography
 Bridgette Yellen – photography

Charts

References

External links
 
 

2004 albums
Saul Williams albums
Albums produced by Serj Tankian
Fader Label albums
Albums produced by Thavius Beck